Cryptanthus dorothyae is a plant species in the genus Cryptanthus. This species is endemic to Brazil.

References

dorothyae
Flora of Brazil